This is a list of Bible colleges, liberal arts colleges, and seminaries owned and operated by the Church of the Nazarene. They are listed by continent and country.

Africa

Côte d'Ivoire
Institut Biblique Nazareen, Abidjan

Kenya
Africa Nazarene School of Extension, Nairobi
Africa Nazarene University, Nairobi

Malawi
Nazarene Theological College of Central Africa, Lilongwe

Mozambique
Seminario Nazareno em Mozambique, Maputo

Nigeria
Nigeria Nazarene Theological College, Abak, Akwa Ibom

South Africa
Nazarene Theological College, Honeydew, Johannesburg, South Africa

Swaziland
Southern Africa Nazarene University, a merger of the following institutions:
Swaziland Nazarene College of Education
Swaziland Nazarene College of Nursing
Swaziland Nazarene College of Theology, Siteki

Asia

India
Nazarene Nurses Training College, Maharashtra
South Asia Nazarene Bible College, Bangalore

Indonesia
Indonesia Nazarene Theological College, Yogyakarta

Japan
Japan Christian Junior College, Chiba, Japan
Japan Nazarene Theological Seminary, Tokyo

Jordan
Eastern Mediterranean Nazarene Bible College, Amman

Philippines
Asia-Pacific Nazarene Theological Seminary, Taytay, Rizal
Community Nazarene Christian School, Inayawan, Cebu
Philippine Nazarene College, (formerly Luzon Nazarene Bible College), Pico, La Trinidad, Benguet
Visayan Nazarene Bible College, Cebu City, Cebu

South Korea
Korea Nazarene University, Cheonan

Taiwan
Taiwan Nazarene Theological College, Beitou, Taipei (inactive)

Thailand
Southeast Asia Nazarene Bible College, Bangkok

Australia and Oceania

Australia
Nazarene Theological College, Thornlands, Queensland

Fiji, Micronesia, Samoa, Solomon Islands, Vanuatu
South Pacific Nazarene Theological College, registered in Apia

Papua New Guinea
Melanesia Nazarene Bible College, Ningei, Mount Hagen, Western Highlands Province, Papua New Guinea
Nazarene College of Nursing, Kudjip, Western Highlands Province
Nazarene Teachers' College, Ningei, Western Highlands Province

Europe

Germany
European Nazarene College, Büsingen

Russia
CIS Education Centers, Moscow

United Kingdom
Nazarene Theological College, Manchester, England

North America

Canada
Ambrose University College, Calgary, Alberta
Institut Biblique Nazaréen du Québec, Québec, Canada

Costa Rica
Seminario Nazareno de las Americas, San José

Cuba
Instituto Biblico Nazareno, Havana

Dominican Republic
Seminario Nazareno Dominicano, Santo Domingo

Guatemala
Instituto Biblico Nazareno, Cobán, Alta Verapaz
Seminario Teológico Nazareno de Guatemala, Guatemala City

Haiti
Séminaire Théologique Nazaréen d'Haïti, Pétion-Ville

Mexico

Seminario Nazareno Mexicano, A.C., Mexico City, Mexican Federal District

Trinidad and Tobago
Caribbean Nazarene Theological College, Santa Cruz

United States
The eight liberal arts colleges have divided the country into "educational regions" and have formed a gentlemen's agreement to not actively recruit outside their educational region:

Eastern Nazarene College in Quincy, Massachusetts (Eastern)
MidAmerica Nazarene University in Olathe, Kansas (North Central)
Mount Vernon Nazarene University in Mount Vernon, Ohio (East Central)
Northwest Nazarene University in Nampa, Idaho (Northwest)
Olivet Nazarene University in Bourbonnais, Illinois (Central)
Point Loma Nazarene University in San Diego, California (Southwest)
Southern Nazarene University in Bethany, Oklahoma (South Central)
Trevecca Nazarene University in Nashville, Tennessee (Southeast)

There are, in addition to the liberal arts colleges, a Bible college and a seminary:

Nazarene Bible College in Colorado Springs, Colorado
Nazarene Theological Seminary in Kansas City, Missouri

South America

Argentina
Seminario Nazareno Sudamericano, Buenos Aires

Bolivia
Seminario Teologico Nazareno de Bolivia, La Paz

Brazil
Faculdade Nazarena do Brasil, Campinas

Chile
Seminario Biblico Nazareno, Santiago

Ecuador
Seminario Teologico Nazareno Sudamericano, Quito

Peru
Instituto Biblico Nazareno, Bagua Chica
Seminario Teologico Nazareno, Chiclayo

See also
Church of the Nazarene
Nazarene International Education Association

External links
Church of the Nazarene International Board of Education
Why These Schools? Historical Perspectives on Nazarene Higher Education by Stan Ingersol
LIBERAL ARTS AND THE PRIORITIES OF NAZARENE HIGHER EDUCATION by J. Matthew Price, Ph.D.

Nazarene schools, List of Church of the
Nazarene higher education